Launch Complex 30 (LC-30) is a former launch complex at Cape Canaveral Space Force Station, Florida. Construction was completed in January 1960, and it served as a launch site for Pershing I missiles until 1963.

References

Cape Canaveral Space Force Station